Love and Learn may refer to:

 Love and Learn (1928 film), a film directed by Frank Tuttle
 Love and Learn (1947 film), a film directed by Frederick de Cordova